Tim Bourke is an Australian bridge player and writer.

He also put together the world's largest collections of English-language bridge books, magazines and Ephemara. Tim and his wife Margaret are in the process of donating this collection to the State Library of Victoria, (search the site "Tim & Margaret Bourke Bridge Collection"). The first three parts of the collection are now with the SLV but only 1733 of several thousand more items have been catalogued as of Feb 2016.

As a player, he has won nine Australian national titles but is now "retired as a tournament player".

He has a degree in mathematics and is an expert in the computer programming language APL and has written extensive bridge odds-calculating routines in that language as well as many bridge-related formatting routines. He is widely regarded as one of the world's most fertile composers of original single-dummy bridge problems.

He has had published over 50 reports on Australian and Zone 7 Teams Championships Finals. His 2010 publication Bridge Books in English 1886 to 2010 - an annotated bibliography with co-author John Sugden contains over 700 pages of listings.  Bourke also assisted the late Anthony Moon in his multi-book project on bridge squeezes.

His joint project with Justin Corfield "the Art of Declarer Play" won the International Bridge Press Book of the Year award in 2014.

Bourke is an honorary member of IPBA, providing journalists with four deals per month for use without attribution as well as MS-Word documents based on BBO files from major championships around the world.

He is married to Margaret Bourke, a many-times International for Australia.

Publications
 
 
 
 
 
 
 
 
 
 
 
 
 
 
 
 
 
 
 
 
 

Bourke has also contributed articles to "The Bridge World", "Bridge Magazine", "Irish Bridge", "New Zealand Bridge" and, of course, to "Australian Bridge". He has provided articles to many Daily Bulletins of late, mostly as daily in a "Test Your Play" format.

References

External links
 
 

Australian contract bridge players
Contract bridge writers
Living people
Place of birth missing (living people)
1947 births